is a Japanese web manga series written and illustrated by Nanashi, also known as 774. The web manga began running in Magazine Pocket, an online and app based web manga magazine published by Kodansha, in November 2017. An anime television series adaptation produced by Telecom Animation Film aired from April to June 2021. A second season by OLM premiered in January 2023.

Plot
Naoto Hachioji, an introverted second-year student at Kazehaya High School, prefers to avoid social interactions and draw manga in his spare time. However, first-year girl Hayase Nagatoro, inadvertently discovers the manga, calls him "Senpai", and teases him to the point of crying. She frequents the Art Club room where he hangs out, and continues to bully him for his timid personality and otaku interests, sometimes in a sexually suggestive fashion, calling him lewd. As she continues to push him to become more assertive, Senpai develops a crush on Nagatoro in return, and gradually comes out of his shell and involves himself in her life.

Senpai meets Nagatoro's friends, Gamo, Yosshii and Sakura, who at first appear to be cruel and shallow high school girls who only seek to torment Senpai, but they catch on to Senpai and Nagatoro's oblivious mutual crush and they become supportive friends who scheme to bring the two closer together. The Art Club's semi-retired president appears and tries to shut down the club, but after a contest challenge during the culture festival, allows it to continue. The next school year, the president's younger cousin enrolls in the high school and joins the Art Club.

Characters

 / 

A first-year high school girl who enjoys teasing Senpai. Although it appears that she just wants to torture him, she secretly has a crush on him, and becomes very hostile toward anyone else who tries to bully Senpai. Her friends call her , and her given name is not revealed until chapter 62. She is a supporting member of the swimming club, and supports other school sports clubs on request. She enjoys performing mixed martial arts moves, and joins the judo club in her second year.
 /  

A timid introvert who tries to avoid social interaction and likes to draw. After meeting Nagatoro and starting to hang out with her and her friends, he progressively gains self-confidence. His first name was revealed in Side Story 5, although a few of his male friends call him , and his last name  was not revealed until the next school year when Sunomiya joins the Art Club. Despite this, Nagatoro calls Naoto "Senpai".
  

One of Nagatoro's friends. She has orange hair in the anime series. She is the most mature among her peers and, despite her tough appearance, often acts as a big sister toward them. She likes to call Senpai  but when she teases him, Nagatoro gets jealous and tells her to stop. Her family runs a mixed martial arts gym. The Volume 10 extra shows a fighting game profile with her English name as Maki Gamou. 
  

 One of Nagatoro's friends with the light hair styled in twin tails and an ahoge (hair that sticks up). She typically follows Gamo around and goes along with whatever schemes she has in mind. She is described as "a bit of an airhead". Much of her speech is repeating what Gamo said.

One of Nagatoro's friends with tan skin and short blonde hair, showing up briefly at the start of the series, and is more active in chapter 27. Her personality on the surface is sweet and quite relaxed, but she enjoys sowing jealousy in groups of boys to compete for her attention, often speaking about stringing along several guys at once for amusement.
 / 

 A third-year student who heads the Art Club. She has long hair that frames her face with crimson eyes, and a busty chest. She has a stern and serious personality, but also has no inhibitions with exposing her body for the sake of her art, which has won prizes. She also bears a resemblance to a female character in one of Senpai's manga. She dislikes that the club has become a hangout for Nagatoro and her friends, and threatens to shut it down with a challenge at the school festival.  However, when her painting is disqualified, she concedes the challenge, withdraws her request, and dresses up as a bunny girl as a punishment by Nagatoro's friends. She later supports Senpai to get along with Nagatoro. A running gag in later chapters is that she often shows up at random locations naked or going commando. She is accepted to the Tokyo University of the Arts. Her given name is not mentioned until chapter 84 when her younger cousin calls her , and her surname is confirmed to be Sunomiya in Chapter 118.

She was shown to be a sort of role model and confidant to Nagatoro. Her given name is not mentioned until chapter 118 where she meets Nagatoro and her friends at a judo training camp.

An Olympic-level judoka who competes at school with Nagatoro and Senpai's friends. When the two were children, she and Nagatoro practiced judo with each other, with Nagatoro's natural ability lets her win every single time, but as Orihara put in constant hard work and became much stronger over time, Nagatoro began losing her passion, ultimately quitting after being overwhelmed by her in a match. She seemed unaware of the strained relationship with Nagatoro, treating her in a friendly and enthusiastic way, and since Nagatoro resumed judo practice, has been friendly and supported/teased her about her relationship with Senpai, along with Gamo.

A first-year who joins the art club at the beginning of the new term. She is the younger cousin of the Club President and was previously in the same art club as Senpai in middle school. She supports Senpai's relationship with Nagatoro, although Nagatoro is suspicious of her and worries Senpai will become interested in Sunomiya. Her given name is not mentioned until volume 11, where it is dropped in an extra sketch between chapters, and is mentioned in the proper story in chapter 88.

Media

Webcomic
Nanashi first started posting early prototypes of what would become Don't Toy with Me Nagatoro on Pixiv between August 2011 and December 2015, there are five total issues during this period.

Manga
Don't Toy with Me, Miss Nagatoro has been serialized through Magazine Pocket, published by Kodansha, since November 1, 2017. The first volume of the manga was released as a print version through Kodansha's Shonen Magazine Comics imprint and as a digital version on March 9, 2018. The second volume was released on June 8, 2018. Fifteen volumes have been released as of January 2023. In addition to the standard edition, there is also a special edition containing works by several other artists. A comic anthology featuring special chapters by various artists was released on April 24, 2021.

The manga has been licensed by Vertical in North America and the first volume was released in November 2019.

Volume list

Anime
An anime television series adaptation was announced on July 2, 2020. The series was directed by Hirokazu Hanai at Telecom Animation Film, with Taku Kishimoto supervising scripts, Misaki Suzuki designing the characters, and Gin composing the music. It aired from April 11 to June 27, 2021, on Tokyo MX and other channels. Crunchyroll licensed the series outside of Southeast Asia. Medialink has licensed the series in Southeast Asia and streamed it on iQIYI, Amazon Prime Video and Ani-One Asia YouTube Channel. Sumire Uesaka performed the opening theme "Easy Love", while Uesaka along with Mikako Komatsu, Aina Suzuki, and Shiori Izawa performed the ending theme . The series ran for 12 episodes.

A second season was announced during an event on October 23, 2021. Titled Don't Toy with Me, Miss Nagatoro 2nd Attack, the season is directed by Shinji Ushiro and produced by OLM, replacing Hanai and Telecom Animation Film. The rest of the main staff returned from the first season. It premiered on January 8, 2023, with ABEMA streaming each episode one week in advance of its televised broadcast. Uesaka performed the opening theme "Love Crazy", while Uesaka along with Komatsu, Suzuki, and Izawa performed the ending theme "My Sadistic Adolescence".

On October 28, 2021, Crunchyroll announced the series would receive an English dub, which premiered on January 11, 2022. English dub voice actress Kimberley Anne Campbell recalled in an interview that she redid her audition to make Nagatoro sound more mean, and "turned on the brattiness and gremlin". English slang phrases were also added to the localized script.

Episode list

Don't Toy with Me, Miss Nagatoro

Don't Toy with Me, Miss Nagatoro 2nd Attack

Reception

Don't Toy with Me, Miss Nagatoro has received mixed reviews. The first few chapters have been criticized for Nagatoro's teasing, with reviewers comparing it to bullying. However, the art and character development has been well received, with Nagatoro showing a softer side as the series progresses.

Don't Toy with Me, Miss Nagatoro has also been compared to other works in the "teasing" genre, such as Teasing Master Takagi-san and Uzaki-chan Wants to Hang Out!

In November 2019, the manga had over one million copies in circulation in Japan, and surpassed 1.2 million in mid-July 2020. As of October 2022, the manga had over 3.3 million copies in circulation.

The series' protagonists were featured in a cameo in Kaguya-sama: Love Is War - Dōjin Edition. Nanashi has also drawn a collaboration manga with Azu's Magical Sempai.

Notes

Works cited
 "Ch." is shortened form for chapter and refers to a chapter number of the Don't Toy with Me, Miss Nagatoro manga.
 "Ep." is shortened form for episode and refers to an episode number of the Don't Toy with Me, Miss Nagatoro anime series.

References

External links
 Ijiranaide, Nagatoro-san on the official Magazine Pocket website 
 Ijiranaide, Nagatoro-san on Kodansha's online store 
 Don't Toy with Me, Miss Nagatoro on Kodansha US's online store 
 Ijiranaide, Nagatoro-san anime website 
 

Anime series based on manga
Art in anime and manga
Crunchyroll anime
Japanese webcomics
Kodansha manga
Medialink
OLM, Inc.
Romantic comedy anime and manga
School life in anime and manga
Shōnen manga
TMS Entertainment
Tokyo MX original programming
Vertical (publisher) titles
Webcomics in print